Morné James Hugo (born 11 October 1991 in Oudtshoorn, South Africa) is a South African rugby union player. His regular position is fly-half.

Career

Youth and Varsity Shield

Hugo went to Worcester Gymnasium, where he played rugby for their first XV and earned a selection to the Boland Under-18 team that played at the 2009 Craven Week competition. In 2010, he represented the  side in the 2010 Under-19 Provincial Championship, starting three of their matches.

In 2012, he was named in the  side that played in the 2012 Varsity Cup competition. However, Hugo failed to make any appearances as the side ended the competition as losing finalists.

He then moved to Pretoria for the latter half of 2012. He was named on the bench for one of the s' matches – against Gauteng rivals  – but failed to make an appearance on the playing field. He enrolled at the Tshwane University of Technology and became their first-choice fly-half for their Varsity Shield campaigns in both 2013 and 2014. He finished the 2013 season as ' top scorer - and joint second overall in the competition – with 68 points from his eight starts as his side disappointingly finished bottom of the log. His record in 2014 was remarkably similar, this time getting 70 points in his eight starts, but again not enough to lift TUT off the foot of the Varsity Shield log.

Eastern Province Kings

He made his first class debut against , coming on as a second-half replacement to help his side to a 28–21 victory against the team he represented as a youth. He made another appearance in their next match two weeks later as the Kings secured a victory over the previously-unbeaten , prevailing 27–11 in a match in Durban. However, they finished the season in fifth spot and missed out on a Quarter Final spot.

Boland Cavaliers

He returned to the Western Cape later in 2014, joining  prior to the 2014 Currie Cup qualification series. Hugo made three starts and played off the bench on two occasions, scoring fifteen points as Boland missed out on the semi-finals, finishing the season in fifth position.

References

South African rugby union players
Living people
1991 births
People from Oudtshoorn
Rugby union fly-halves
Boland Cavaliers players
Eastern Province Elephants players
Tshwane University of Technology alumni
Rugby union players from the Western Cape